Fieni is a town in Dâmbovița County, Muntenia, Romania, on the Ialomița River, having a population of 7,587. It administers two villages, Berevoești and Costești.

The town is situated in a hilly area south of the Bucegi Mountains, on the banks of the Ialomița River.

The St. Nicholas Church of Fieni, built in 1804, is a historical monument. A cement factory in Fieni was bought in 2002 by the German company HeidelbergCement. The local football team, Cimentul Fieni, was founded in 1936 and played in Divizia C, before being dissolved in 2005. The home ground of the team was Stadionul Cimentul.

Natives
Aryeh Finkel (1931–2016), rabbi
Olga Homeghi (born 1958), rower
Gheorghe Leahu (born 1968), footballer

References

Towns in Romania
Populated places in Dâmbovița County
Localities in Muntenia